My Ride's Here is the eleventh studio album by American singer-songwriter Warren Zevon. The album was released on May 7, 2002, by Artemis Records. Zevon described it as "a meditation on death"; it was released several months before Zevon was diagnosed with terminal mesothelioma.

On My Ride's Here, Zevon collaborated with a number of writers from outside the world of music. The song "Basket Case" features in Carl Hiaasen's novel of the same name. He also covers Serge Gainsbourg's "	
Laissez-Moi Tranquille" which roughly translates as "leave me alone". Gainsbourg first recorded it in 1960 on the Romantique 60 EP. "I Have to Leave" was a song written by Zevon's high school friend, Dan McFarland.

Reception

Mark Deming of AllMusic rated My Ride's Here two out of five stars. He stated that "the jokes tend to be a bit obvious", and that "the more introspective moments don't connect the way one might hope". However, he said that some of the tracks "are strong enough to remind listeners of just how talented Zevon still is". He concluded by saying that the album "is a misfire from an artist capable of much better work." Robert Christgau rated the album an A−, stating that Zevon was "at his best in the fictional-mythic mode that prevails".

Track listing

Personnel
Warren Zevon – guitar, keyboards, vocals
Charlie Bisharat – violin on "Genius"
Larry Corbett – cello on "Genius"
Joel Derouin – violin on "Genius"
Anton Fig – drums
Sheldon Gomberg – bass guitar
David Letterman – background vocals on "Hit Somebody! (The Hockey Song)"
Tony Levin – bass guitar on "Hit Somebody! (The Hockey Song)"
Sid McGinnis – guitar on "Hit Somebody! (The Hockey Song)"
Katy Salvidge – fiddle, tin whistle
Paul Shaffer – organ on "Hit Somebody! (The Hockey Song)"
Evan Wilson – viola on "Genius"
Michael Wolff – organ on "You're a Whole Different Person When You're Scared"
Jordan Zevon, Ariel Zevon, David Letterman – additional vocals

Production
Warren Zevon – producer, mixing, arranger
Michael Delugg – engineer
 Harvey Goldberg – engineer
Klint Macro – engineer
 Will Schillinger – engineer
 Noah Scot Snyder – engineer, mixing
Stephen Marcussen – mastering
Michael Krumper – A&R
 Henry Diltz – photography

Charts
Album

References

Warren Zevon albums
2002 albums
Artemis Records albums
Albums produced by Warren Zevon